Li Siqi may refer to:
 Louise Lee (born 1950), or Louise Lee Si-kei, Hong Kong actress and newscaster
 Li Siqi (footballer) (born 1997), Chinese footballer